Oak Grove is a historic plantation house located near Altavista, Campbell County, Virginia.  It was built in stages between the 1750s and 1833.  The oldest section is a two-story dog-trot log structure built around 1750. The house was enlarged in 1784, and completed around 1833 by adding a west wing.  It is a two-story, three bay structure containing a large hall and a parlor on the first floor and a stair hall and two bedrooms on the second in the Federal style.  Also on the property are a contributing smokehouse, a slave quarter, a grain shed, a hay barn, and a privy as well as the remains of a kitchen and an icehouse.

It was listed on the National Register of Historic Places in 2002.

References

Plantation houses in Virginia
Houses on the National Register of Historic Places in Virginia
Federal architecture in Virginia
Houses completed in 1833
Houses in Campbell County, Virginia
National Register of Historic Places in Campbell County, Virginia